Gaetano Callani (16 January 1736 – 6 November 1809) was an Italian painter and sculptor, active mainly in his native Parma in a Neoclassical style.

Biography
Born at Parma, he was a pupil of Giambettino Cignaroli . He helped decorate the Room of the Caryatids (1774-1776) at the Royal Palace of Milan. In Parma, he competed the statues of Isaiah and St John the Evangelist for the church of the Annunziata and the Beatitudes for the church of Sant'Antonio Abate, Parma. Both his children, Francesco (1779-1844) and Maria Callani, were also painters.

References

1736 births
1809 deaths
18th-century Italian painters
Italian male painters
19th-century Italian painters
Painters from Parma
Italian neoclassical painters
19th-century Italian male artists
18th-century Italian male artists